Grimentz is a village in the district of Sierre in the Swiss canton of Valais. An independent municipality before, it merged on 1 January 2009 with neighboring Ayer, Chandolin, Saint Jean, Saint-Luc and Vissoie to form the municipality of Anniviers.

History
Grimentz is first mentioned in 1052 as Grimiens.  The village was formerly known by its German name Grimensi, however, that name is no longer used.

Geography

Lac de Moiry is a reservoir completed 1958.
Grimentz lies at  altitude above sea level.

The village lies in the Val d'Anniviers in the Pennine Alps.

Coat of arms
The blazon of the village coat of arms is Azure between two Mullets of Four Argent a semi-orb sinister of the same and on the chief of the last four Mullets of Five of the first.

Demographics
Grimentz has a population of 385.  Most of the population speaks French (373 or 92.3%) as their first language, Portuguese is the second most common (16 or 4.0%) and German is the third (9 or 2.2%).  There are 2 people who speak Italian.

Of the population in the village, 229 or about 56.7% were born in Grimentz and lived there in 2000.  There were 65 or 16.1% who were born in the same canton, while 52 or 12.9% were born somewhere else in Switzerland, and 58 or 14.4% were born outside of Switzerland.

, there were 168 people who were single and never married in the village.  There were 213 married individuals, 18 widows or widowers and 5 individuals who are divorced.

There were 49 households that consist of only one person and 14 households with five or more people.  , a total of 159 apartments (15.2% of the total) were permanently occupied, while 856 apartments (81.8%) were seasonally occupied and 32 apartments (3.1%) were empty.

The historical population is given in the following chart:

Politics
In the 2007 federal election the most popular party was the CVP which received 57.69% of the vote.  The next three most popular parties were the SVP (13.26%), the SP (11.62%) and the FDP (10.84%).  In the federal election, a total of 243 votes were cast, and the voter turnout was 76.2%.

Economy
There were 216 residents of the village who were employed in some capacity, of which females made up 44.0% of the workforce.   the total number of full-time equivalent jobs was 229.  The number of jobs in the primary sector was 10, all of which were in agriculture.  The number of jobs in the secondary sector was 63 of which 14 or (22.2%) were in manufacturing and 49 (77.8%) were in construction.  The number of jobs in the tertiary sector was 156.  In the tertiary sector; 30 or 19.2% were in the sale or repair of motor vehicles, 16 or 10.3% were in the movement and storage of goods, 58 or 37.2% were in a hotel or restaurant, 5 or 3.2% were the insurance or financial industry, 5 or 3.2% were technical professionals or scientists, 1 was in education.

, there were 49 workers who commuted into the village and 29 workers who commuted away.  The village is a net importer of workers, with about 1.7 workers entering the village for every one leaving.

Religion

Of the rest of the population, there was 1 member of an Orthodox church, and there was 1 individual who belongs to another Christian church.  9 (or about 2.23% of the population) belonged to no church, are agnostic or atheist, and 1 individual (or about 0.25% of the population) did not answer the question.

Weather
Grimentz has an average of 106.7 days of rain or snow per year and on average receives  of precipitation. During this month there is precipitation for an average of 10.9 days.

Education
In Grimentz about 166 or (41.1%) of the population have completed non-mandatory upper secondary education, and 29 or (7.2%) have completed additional higher education (either University or a Fachhochschule).  Of the 29 who completed tertiary schooling, 48.3% were Swiss men, 41.4% were Swiss women.

, there were 2 students in Grimentz who came from another village, while 36 residents attended schools outside the village.

References

External links

 Official website 
 

Former municipalities of Valais
Villages in Valais
Ski areas and resorts in Switzerland
Anniviers